Tailteann Games or Aonach Tailteann may refer to:
 Tailteann Games (ancient) sporting and religious festival in Gaelic Ireland
 Tailteann Games (Irish Free State) held 1924–32
 Tailteann Games, Athletics Ireland schools' inter-provincial championships, held since 1963

See also
 Tailteann (disambiguation)